John Beasley Greene (1832 – November 1856) was a French-born American Egyptologist and one of the earliest archaeological documentary photographers. He died at the age of 24. Because of his early demise, his pioneering work was quickly forgotten. The first important study of Greene was published in 1981.

Biography 
The son of an American banker, Greene was born in Le Havre and later lived in at 10 rue de la Grange Bateliere in the 9th arrondissement of Paris.

His work combined two passions: the new technology of photography and the discovery of Ancient Egypt. He employed a waxed paper negative process learned from Gustave Le Gray.

After his father's death in 1850, Greene was able to finance his first trip to Egypt in 1854.

He was a founding member of the Société française de photographie, founded on 15 November 1854. That same year, he published photographs from his expedition under the title, Le Nil : monuments, paysages, explorations photographiques.

In Algeria, on his second trip in late 1855 and early 1856, he photographed excavation campaigns of the Royal Mausoleum of Mauretania in Algeria, led by Louis-Adrien Berbrugger.

He died in Cairo, possibly of tuberculosis, at the age of 24.

Gallery

Exhibitions
The San Francisco Museum of Modern Art hosted an exhibition titled "Signs and Wonders: The Photographs of John Beasley Greene" (31 August 2019 – 5 January 2020).

Publications 
 Le Nil : monuments, paysages, explorations photographiques, Lille, Imprimerie photographique de Blanquart-Évrard, 1854.
 Fouilles Executées à Thèbes dans l'année 1855
 Photographes en Algérie au XIXe siècle. Paris

Collections 
 Bibliothèque de l'institut
 Cabinet des estampes de la BNF
 Smithsonian American Art Museum
 Musée de l'Élysée, Lausanne
 George Eastman House
 San Francisco Museum of Modern Art
 Art Institute of Chicago

References

External links 

 

19th-century American photographers
19th-century French photographers
1832 births
1856 deaths
Photography in Egypt
Pioneers of photography
Egyptology
French Egyptologists